Tonči Boban (born 30 November 1971) is a retired Croatian footballer.

Boban made a total of 15 appearances in the 2. Bundesliga during his career, having played mostly in Germany.

References

External links 
 

1971 births
Living people
Croatian footballers
Association football midfielders
2. Bundesliga players
Tennis Borussia Berlin players
FC Erzgebirge Aue players
SV Babelsberg 03 players
Croatian expatriate footballers
Expatriate footballers in Germany